Graveyard is a Swedish hard rock band from Gothenburg, formed in 2006.

History

Joakim Nilsson, Rikard Edlund (both formerly of Norrsken), Axel Sjöberg, and Truls Mörck formed Graveyard in 2006. When Norrsken disbanded in 2000, guitarist Magnus Pelander went on to form doomy folk metal act Witchcraft and Nilsson and Edlund joined Albatross, a growly blues rock band whose lineup also included Sjöberg on drums. Initially, they considered Albatross a hobby project, but after five years the members began taking their music more seriously and had grown dissatisfied with the direction their sound had taken. When Albatross broke up, Nilsson and Edlund decided that for their next venture, they would head back towards their roots as musicians and songwriters. Nilsson explains, “I am a singer, but in Albatross I only played guitar. Rikard played guitar but he is a bass player. We also wanted a more straightforward [rock] sound.”

Together with Sjöberg and guitarist/singer Truls Mörck (not to be confused with Truls Mørk) they began practicing as Graveyard. Upon their initial formation, Graveyard quickly recorded a two track demo, played a total of three shows, and began planning for a full-length album with Swedish label Transubstans Records. In the meantime, they posted a demo of some of their material on Myspace. Songs from the band's Myspace caught the ear of Tony Presedo, founder of Tee Pee Records. Their self-titled debut album was recorded by Don Ahlsterberg and released in early 2008. On the recording sessions' completion, Truls Mörck was replaced by guitarist Jonatan Ramm. The debut album received generally good reviews. Graveyard performed at the 2008's South by Southwest Music Festival.

Graveyard was featured on Rolling Stones Fricke's Picks for their first ever US gig at SXSW. After SXSW, Graveyard toured with label mates Witch. In the fall of 2008 Graveyard toured with Witchcraft and then Clutch. In 2009 they toured with the rock band CKY. Graveyard released their second album in spring of 2011. In 2013, they toured Europe with Soundgarden. In October 2014, the band announced that bass player and co-founder Rikard Edlund was leaving the band to "pursue other musical ventures".

In September 2015, the band released Innocence & Decadence full-length album through Nuclear Blast. On their official Facebook page, Joakim Nilsson announced that Graveyard are working on dates for a worldwide tour: "We're excited to visit new places, where we haven't been before. I always wanted to play Japan, Brazil, a little bit more of Eastern Europe, especially Ukraine, where my cousin lives. Andy we're coming!" According to Nilsson's interview for Terrorizer magazine, his cousin is Ukrainian underground musician Andrii Tatarenko.

On 23 September 2016, the band announced they had broken up, citing, "all so classic reasons." Graveyard announced their reunion on 26 January 2017, with a new drummer as drummer Axel Sjöberg decided to stay with his new band. On 18 December 2017, the band announced on its Facebook page that they were working on a new album. On 22 March 2018, the band announced that the album is called Peace. It was released on 25 May 2018.

Band members
Current members
Joakim Nilsson – guitar, vocals
Jonatan Larocca-Ramm – guitar, vocals
Truls Mörck – bass, vocals
Oskar Bergenheim – drums

Former members
Rikard Edlund – bass
Axel Sjöberg – drums

Discography

Albums

EPs and singles
 "Ancestors / Graveyard" – Split 7" (Volcom Entertainment, 2009)
 "Hisingen Blues" – 7" single (2011)
 "Goliath" – 7" single (Nuclear Blast, 2012)

References

External links

Graveyard official website
Graveyard official Myspace
TransubstansRecords
TeepeeRecords
Hisingen Blues review on Prog Sphere

Swedish rock music groups
Musical quartets
Musical groups established in 2006
Musical groups disestablished in 2016
Musical groups reestablished in 2017
Nuclear Blast artists